Oak Knoll is an unincorporated community in Napa County, California. It lies at an elevation of 112 feet (34 m).

References

Unincorporated communities in Napa County, California
Napa Valley
Unincorporated communities in California